An Essay on Typography is a 1931 book by Eric Gill about the history of typographical art and production. It has been considered a classic since its first publication: the influential graphic designer Paul Rand called it 'timeless and absorbing' in a review for The New York Times.

The first edition of the book was typeset by Gill himself in his own Joanna typeface, making use of typographical features similar to those seen on handwritten manuscripts.

References 

Typography